Christie Colin (maiden name Bisco) (born June 14, 1982) is an American compound archer. She is the current World Archery number eight in women's compound archery. The highest ranking she has reached is the eighth position, which she reached for the last time in June 2012.

Achievements
Source:
		

2003
15th, World Outdoor Championships, individual, New York City
2005
 World Outdoor Championships, women's team, Madrid
55th, World Outdoor Championships, individual, Madrid
2006
 World Cup, women's team, San Salvador
 World Cup, women's team, Shanghai
2007
 World Indoor Championships, women's team, Izmir
9th, World Indoor Championships, individual, Izmir
2011
 Arizona Cup, individual, Phoenix, Arizona
 Arizona Cup, women's team, Phoenix, Arizona
 World Cup, mixed team, Poreč
 World Cup, women's team, Antalya
 World Cup, mixed team, Antalya

2011 (continued)
 World Outdoor Championships, women's team, Turin
9th, World Outdoor Championships, individual, Turin
 World Cup, women's team, Ogden
 World Cup, mixed team, Ogden
 World Cup, women's team, Shanghai
 World Cup Final, individual, Istanbul

2012
 World Indoor Championships, women's team, Las Vegas
4th, World Indoor Championships, individual, Las Vegas
9th, Indoor World Cup Final, individual, Las Vegas
 Arizona Cup, women's team, Phoenix, Arizona
 World Cup, women's team, Shanghai
 World Cup, women's team, Antalya

2017
 The World Games 2017, Wroclaw, Poland

References

External links
 

American female archers
Living people
1982 births
World Games bronze medalists
World Games medalists in archery
Competitors at the 2017 World Games
21st-century American women
Sportspeople from Portland, Maine
20th-century American women